Laura Montalvo and Henrieta Nagyová were the defending champions but only Montalvo competed that year with Paola Suárez.

Montalvo and Suárez won the final on a walkover against Joannette Kruger and Mirjana Lučić.

Seeds
Champion seeds are indicated in bold text while text in italics indicates the round in which those seeds were eliminated.

 Nana Miyagi /  Corina Morariu (semifinals)
 Laura Montalvo /  Paola Suárez (champions)
 Laura Golarsa /  Liezel Horn (quarterfinals)
 Virag Csurgo /  Eva Martincová (quarterfinals)

Draw

External links
 1998 Croatian Bol Ladies Open Doubles Draw 

Croatian Bol Ladies Open
1998 WTA Tour